The 2018 Uruguay Open was a professional tennis tournament played on clay courts. It was the fourteenth edition of the tournament which was part of the 2018 ATP Challenger Tour. It took place at the Carrasco Lawn Tennis Club in Montevideo, Uruguay between November 5 and 11, 2018.

Singles main-draw entrants

Seeds

 1 Rankings are as of 29 October 2018.

Other entrants
The following players received wildcards into the singles main draw:
  Martín Cuevas
  Francisco Llanes
  Thiago Seyboth Wild
  Carlos Taberner

The following player received entry into the singles main draw as an alternate:
  Facundo Argüello

The following players received entry from the qualifying draw:
  Federico Coria
  Facundo Díaz Acosta
  Juan Ignacio Galarza
  Dimitar Kuzmanov

Champions

Singles

 Guido Pella def.  Carlos Berlocq 6–3, 3–6, 6–1.

Doubles

 Guido Andreozzi /  Guillermo Durán def.  Facundo Bagnis /  Andrés Molteni 7–6(7–5), 6–4.

External links
Official Website

2018 ATP Challenger Tour
2018
2018 in Uruguayan tennis